In Sunni Islam, the Hadith of Gabriel (also known as, Ḥadīth Jibrīl) is a hadith of the Islamic prophet Muhammad (the last prophet of Islam) which expresses the religion of Islam in a concise manner. and it contains a summary of the core of the religion of Islam, which are:
 Islām (إسلام), which is described with the "Five Pillars of Islam,"
 Īmān (إيمان), which is described with the "Six Articles of Faith,"
 Iḥsān (إحسان), or "doing what is beautiful," and 
 al-Sā’ah (الساعة), or The Hour, which is not described, but its signs are given. 

This hadith is found in both the Ṣaḥīḥ al-Bukhārī and the Ṣaḥīḥ Muslim collections. It has been named "Ḥadīth Jibrīl" (the Hadith of Gabriel) by Islamic scholars because the archangel Gabriel appears to Muhammad and those around him in a human form.

Al-Bukhārī's version

Muslim's version

References

External links
Hadith of Gabriel: Angel Jibril came to teach you Islam - Abu Amina Elias (Text of the original Hadith in Arabic with sources)
HADITH JIBRIL - Hadith Answers

Gabriel
Hadith